Ostroglyadovo is a rural locality (a selo) in Starodubsky District, Bryansk Oblast, Russia. The population was 522 as of 2010. There are 12 streets.

Geography 
Ostroglyadovo  is located 5 km northwest of Starodub (the district's administrative centre) by road. Shkryabino and Starodub are the nearest rural localities.

References 

Rural localities in Starodubsky District